Walter Viitala (born 9 January 1992) is a Finnish footballer who plays as goalkeeper for Inter Turku.

Club career
On 15 December 2016, Viitala signed a 2.5-year contract with Viborg FF on a free transfer from IFK Mariehamn. He made his debut in a 1–0 victory against AaB on 8 April 2017.

On 11 August 2018 Viitala signed for Swedish champions Malmö FF. He signed a short-term contract for the rest of the year to replace injured back-up goalkeeper Fredrik Andersson. He made his first appearance for Malmö FF on 23 September 2018, when he replaced an injured Johan Dahlin at halftime in a 4–0 victory over Kalmar FF. He made his first start a week later in a 0–0 draw against GIF Sundsvall.

On 2 December 2021, he joined Inter Turku on a two-year contract.

International career
In November 2016, Viitala received his first call-up to the senior Finland squad for the match against Ukraine. He made a debut on 9 January 2017 in a 1–0 win against Morocco in Al Ain.

Career statistics

Club
.

Honours
IFK Mariehamn
Veikkausliiga (1): 2016
Individual
Veikkausliiga Goalkeeper of the Year: 2016
Veikkausliiga Team of the Year: 2016

References

External links
 

1992 births
Living people
Finnish footballers
Finnish expatriate footballers
FC Honka players
IFK Mariehamn players
Viborg FF players
Malmö FF players
Sandefjord Fotball players
HIFK Fotboll players
Pallohonka players
Seinäjoen Jalkapallokerho players
FC Inter Turku players
Allsvenskan players
Norwegian First Division players
Danish Superliga players
Danish 1st Division players
Veikkausliiga players
Finland youth international footballers
Finland under-21 international footballers
Finland international footballers
Finnish expatriate sportspeople in Denmark
Finnish expatriate sportspeople in Sweden
Finnish expatriate sportspeople in Norway
Expatriate men's footballers in Denmark
Expatriate footballers in Sweden
Expatriate footballers in Norway
Association football goalkeepers
Footballers from Helsinki